Justified is an American neo-Western television series which premiered March 16, 2010, on FX. The series was developed for television by Graham Yost, based on a series of novels and short stories by Elmore Leonard, and stars Timothy Olyphant as Deputy U.S. Marshal Raylan Givens. The series aired 78 episodes over six seasons and concluded on April 14, 2015.

Series overview

Episodes

Season 1 (2010)

Season 2 (2011)

Season 3 (2012)

Season 4 (2013)

Season 5 (2014)

Season 6 (2015)

Ratings

References

External links 
 
 

Justified (TV series)
Justified
Lists of American Western (genre) television series episodes